Émile Baffert (26 August 1924 – 25 July 2017) was a French professional road bicycle racer. In 1950, he was the winner of the last stage of the 1950 Tour de France. He was born in Grenoble.

Major results

1946
Circuit des Bords de l'Ain
1947
Nantua
1949
Commentry
Charlieu
1950
Gap
Tour de France:
Winner stage 22
Tour de Haute-Savoie
1952
Aubusson
Circuit du Mont Blanc
Firminy
Grand-Bourg
Grenoble
Nantua
Romans
1953
Aubenas
1955
GP Kanton Geneva
Riom
Circuit de Drome - Ardèche

References

External links 

Official Tour de France results for Emile Baffert

1924 births
2017 deaths
Sportspeople from Grenoble
French male cyclists
French Tour de France stage winners
Cyclists from Auvergne-Rhône-Alpes
20th-century French people
21st-century French people